Arnold Rosenberg may refer to:

 Arnold L. Rosenberg (born 1941), American computer scientist
 Arnold T. Rosenberg (1931–2017), photographer